Vararia is a genus of corticioid fungi in the family Lachnocladiaceae. The genus contains over 50 species that collectively have a widespread distribution.

Species

Vararia abortiphysa
Vararia alticola
Vararia ambigua
Vararia amphithallica
Vararia athabascensis
Vararia aurantiaca
Vararia breviphysa
Vararia calami
Vararia callichroa
Vararia cinnamomea
Vararia cremea
Vararia cremeoavellanea
Vararia cunninghamii
Vararia dussii
Vararia ellipsospora
Vararia fibra
Vararia firma
Vararia fusispora
Vararia gallica
Vararia gillesii
Vararia gittonii
Vararia gomezii
Vararia gracilispora
Vararia hauerslevii
Vararia incrustata
Vararia insolita
Vararia intricata
Vararia investiens
Vararia malaysiana
Vararia maremmana
Vararia mediospora
Vararia microphysa
Vararia minidichophysa
Vararia minispora
Vararia ochroleuca
Vararia parmastoi
Vararia pectinata
Vararia perplexa
Vararia phyllophila
Vararia pirispora
Vararia protrusa
Vararia racemosa
Vararia rhombospora
Vararia rosulenta
Vararia rugosispora
Vararia sigmatospora
Vararia sphaericospora
Vararia splendida
Vararia thujae
Vararia trinidadensis
Vararia tropica
Vararia ubatubensis
Vararia longicystidiata
Vararia vassilievae
Vararia verrucosa

References

Russulales
Russulales genera